NGC 3552 is a lenticular galaxy in the constellation Ursa Major. It was discovered on April 11, 1785 by William Herschel. It is a member of the galaxy cluster Abell 1185.

References

External links
 

3552
Lenticular galaxies
Ursa Major (constellation)
033932